Whatever You Want is the twelfth studio album by the British rock band Status Quo.

This was the band's third album to be produced by Pip Williams. Recording began in December 1978 at Wisseloord Studios in Hilversum, the Netherlands, with the final mixes being completed in London in March 1979. The album was released on 12 October 1979 and entered the chart on 20 October 1979, reaching as high as no. 4. The first single from the album – "Whatever You Want" – was released on 14 September, with "Hard Ride" as the B-side, and also reached a peak position of no. 4. The second single from the album was "Living on an Island", with the B-side "Runaway". This was released on 16 November 1979 and reached no. 16 in the chart.

The album was remixed for the US market and this version was released in the US with the title Now Hear This in 1980. It was finally released on CD as part of the 2016 deluxe remaster. However this omitted two songs, "Shady Lady" and "Your Smiling Face". These are therefore only available on the original vinyl/cassette/8-track releases. The tracks "Whatever You Want" and "Living on an Island" were also swapped in the running order of the US remixed version.

Track listing
 "Whatever You Want" (Rick Parfitt, Andy Bown) – 4:04
 "Shady Lady" (Francis Rossi, Bob Young) – 3:00
 "Who Asked You" (Alan Lancaster) – 4:00
 "Your Smiling Face" (Parfitt, Bown) – 4:25
 "Living on an Island" (Parfitt, Young) – 4:48
 "Come Rock with Me" (Rossi, Bernie Frost) – 3:15	
 "Rockin' On" (Rossi, Frost) – 3:25  	 	
 "Runaway" (Rossi, Frost) – 4:39	  	
 "High Flyer" (Lancaster, Young) – 3:47	
 "Breaking Away" (Rossi, Parfitt, Bown) – 6:44

2005 reissue bonus tracks

 "Hard Ride" (Lancaster, Mick Green)
 "Bad Company" (Pip Williams, Peter Hutchins)
 "Another Game in Town" (demo) (Rossi, Frost)
 "Shady Lady" (demo) (Rossi, Young)
 "Rearrange" (demo) (Rossi, Frost)
 "Living on an Island" (single version) (Parfitt, Young)

Re-releases
The album was first released in CD format in 1991, on a CD also containing Just Supposin'. To make the two albums fit the single disc, the track "High Flyer" was omitted, while the song "The Wild Ones" was omitted from Just Supposin'.

The album was digitally remastered and released in CD format in 2005. The first release was on 7 March 2005 by Mercury Records in the UK; the second on 12 July 2005 by Universal Records International in the US and elsewhere.

Personnel 
Status Quo
Francis Rossi – guitar, vocals
Rick Parfitt – guitar, vocals
Alan Lancaster – bass, vocals
John Coghlan – drums

Additional personnel
Andy Bown – keyboards
Bob Young – harmonica

Chart positions

Weekly charts

Year-end charts

Certifications

References

Status Quo (band) albums
1979 albums
Vertigo Records albums